Lee Seon-Ok (born 2 February 1981) is a South Korean field hockey player. At the 2008 and 2012 Summer Olympics she competed with the Korea women's national field hockey team in the women's tournament.

References

External links
 

1981 births
Living people
South Korean female field hockey players
Asian Games medalists in field hockey
Asian Games silver medalists for South Korea
Field hockey players at the 2002 Asian Games
Field hockey players at the 2004 Summer Olympics
Field hockey players at the 2008 Summer Olympics
Field hockey players at the 2010 Asian Games
Field hockey players at the 2012 Summer Olympics
Medalists at the 2002 Asian Games
Medalists at the 2010 Asian Games
Olympic field hockey players of South Korea
Place of birth missing (living people)
20th-century South Korean women
21st-century South Korean women